Parliamentary elections were held in Yugoslavia on 8 November 1931. Voters were presented with a single list of candidates supporting the royal dictatorship of King Alexander. The list was headed by Prime Minister Petar Živković.

Background

Alexander abolished the Vidovdan Constitution, prorogued the National Assembly and introduced a personal dictatorship on 6 January 1929. The next day, General Petar Živković became prime minister, heading the regime's Yugoslav Radical Peasants' Democracy. A new constitution was promulgated in September 1931, under which the elections were held.

Results

References

Yugoslavia
Parliamentary
Elections in Yugoslavia
One-party elections
Yugoslavia
Election and referendum articles with incomplete results